Paul Nagel (24 July 1831 – 10 September 1880) was a Swiss politician and president of the Swiss Council of States (1876/1877).

References

External links 

People from Thurgau
Members of the Council of States (Switzerland)
Presidents of the Council of States (Switzerland)
1831 births
1880 deaths